Ji Cheng (born 15 July 1987) is a Chinese former professional cyclist, who rode professionally between 2006 and 2016 for  and .

Career
Before taking up cycling, Ji competed as a runner whilst at school. Initially a track cyclist, he later switched to road racing. Ji moved to Europe in 2006, competing in amateur criterium races in the Netherlands before turning professional.

In 2012, Ji became the first Chinese rider to race in, and complete, a Grand Tour, when he finished 175th at the Vuelta a España. By taking the start in the 2013 Giro d'Italia, he likewise became the first Chinese cyclist to start that race. The following year he was selected for the 2014 Tour de France, and became the first Chinese rider to compete in the Tour. Ji managed to complete the race despite a knee injury, finishing last as the 2014 race's lanterne rouge.

Major results

2008
 1st Stage 1 Tour of South China Sea
2012
  Combativity award Stage 19 Vuelta a España

Grand Tour general classification results timeline

References

External links
 Profile on team website

1987 births
Chinese male cyclists
Living people
Cyclists from Harbin
21st-century Chinese people